Carlos Schwanke (born 5 May 1974) is a Brazilian volleyball player. He competed in the men's tournament at the 1996 Summer Olympics.

References

External links
 

1974 births
Living people
Brazilian men's volleyball players
Olympic volleyball players of Brazil
Volleyball players at the 1996 Summer Olympics
People from Brusque, Santa Catarina
Sportspeople from Santa Catarina (state)